Chodavaram may refer to:

Chodavaram, Anakapalli district, a village in Andhra Pradesh, India
Chodavaram, Nagayalanka mandal, a village the Nagayalanka mandal of Krishna district of Andhra Pradesh, India
Chodavaram, Penamaluru mandal, a village in Penamaluru mandal of Krishna district in Andhra Pradesh, India
Chodavaram, East Godavari, a village in Andhra Pradesh, India
Chodavaram, Prakasam district, a village in Andhra Pradesh, India
Chodavaram (East), a village in the Nallajerla mandal of West Godavari district of Andhra Pradesh, India
Chodavaram (West), a village in the Nallajerla mandal of West Godavari district of Andhra Pradesh, India
 Chodavaram (Assembly constituency)